Gradina (Serbian Cyrillic: Градина) is a mountain on the border of Serbia and Montenegro, between cities of Priboj and Pljevlja.

References

Mountains of Serbia
Mountains of Montenegro
Montenegro–Serbia border